Melanoplus oregonensis, the oregon short-wing grasshopper, is a species of spur-throated grasshopper in the family Acrididae. It is found in North America.

Subspecies
These two subspecies belong to the species Melanoplus oregonensis:
 Melanoplus oregonensis oregonensis (Thomas, 1876) i
 Melanoplus oregonensis triangularis Hebard, 1928 i
Data sources: i = ITIS, c = Catalogue of Life, g = GBIF, b = Bugguide.net

References

Melanoplinae
Articles created by Qbugbot
Insects described in 1876